Beeravalli is a village in Dharwad district of Karnataka, India.

Demographics
As of the 2011 Census of India there were 434 households in Beeravalli and a total population of 2,080 consisting of 1,102 males and 978 females. There were 268 children ages 0-6.

References

Villages in Dharwad district